Stenancylus is a genus of true weevils in the beetle family Curculionidae. There are about nine described species in Stenancylus.

Species
These nine species belong to the genus Stenancylus:
 Stenancylus chiriquensis Csiki & E., 1936
 Stenancylus colomboi Casey, 1892
 Stenancylus laeviusculus Wibmer & O'Brien, 1986
 Stenancylus linearis Wibmer & O'Brien, 1986
 Stenancylus montivagus Csiki & E., 1936
 Stenancylus punctatus Wibmer & O'Brien, 1986
 Stenancylus similis Wibmer & O'Brien, 1986
 Stenancylus stenosoma (Blatchley, 1916)
 Stenancylus troglodytes Wibmer & O'Brien, 1986

References

Further reading

 
 
 

Cossoninae
Articles created by Qbugbot